Johanne Morasse (born March 12, 1957 in Duparquet, Quebec) is a Quebec politician and teacher. She was a Member of National Assembly of Quebec for the riding of Rouyn-Noranda–Témiscamingue in the Abitibi-Témiscamingue region from 2007 to 2008. She represents the Parti Québécois.

Morasse holds a bachelor's degree in political science from Université Laval. She went to the University of British Columbia and obtained a master's degree in forestry. She also went to study in Finland and received a doctorate in forestry and agriculture from the University of Helsinki.

She worked at the Faculty of Forestry and Geometrics at the Université Laval as a teacher, lecturer and research assistant. She also worked as a teaching assistant at the University of British Columbia. She was also a forestry engineer consultant and the Director of the Centre technologique des résidus industriels (Industrial Residual Technology Center). She was also an administration member at the Université du Québec en Abitibi-Témiscamingue and was treasurer of the Regional Economique Development Council of the Abitibi-Témiscamingue.

Morasse won the seat in the 2007 elections by defeating Liberal incumbent MNA Daniel Bernard.

Election results

|-
 
|Liberal
|Daniel Bernard
|align="right"|10,358
|align="right"|42.30
|align="right"| +9.64

|-
|}

|-
 
|Liberal
|Daniel Bernard
|align="right"|9,352
|align="right"|32.66
|align="right"|

|-
|}

External links
 
 PQ webpage 

1957 births
French Quebecers
Living people
Parti Québécois MNAs
People from Abitibi-Témiscamingue
Université Laval alumni
University of British Columbia alumni
Women MNAs in Quebec
21st-century Canadian politicians
21st-century Canadian women politicians